Dan Weston is a Canadian record producer, engineer, and mixer. He was born in Montreal. Weston has worked in a variety of musical genres, but is best known for his work with such artists as Juno award winner Shad, Classified, Daniel Romano, and Attack in Black.

Discography

References 

Canadian record producers
Living people
People from Montreal
Year of birth missing (living people)